David Frank Corbett (15 April 1940 – 13 April 2020) was an English professional footballer who played as a right winger.

Career
Born in Marshfield, Corbett played for Marshfield, Swindon Town and Plymouth Argyle, making 152 appearances in the Football League. He retired at the age of 26 due to injury.

Later life and death
He died on 13 April 2020, aged 79.

References

1940 births
2020 deaths
English footballers
Swindon Town F.C. players
Plymouth Argyle F.C. players
English Football League players
Association football wingers
People from Marshfield, Gloucestershire